Charles "Peter" Moscatt (died 23 August 2019) was an Australian rugby league footballer who played in the 1960s and 1970s. He played for Eastern Suburbs in the New South Wales Rugby League (NSWRL) competition.

Playing career
A Bondi local, Moscatt played his junior rugby league with the Charing Cross club in Waverley before coming through Eastern Suburbs junior ranks. He played a season of Group 8 rugby league with Queanbeyan before a season with Leeds in England.

Moscatt made his first grade debut for Eastern Suburbs in 1969 establishing himself as the club's first choice hooker.  In 1972, Eastern Suburbs reached the grand final against Manly-Warringah.  Moscatt played at hooker in the game as Easts went on to lose the grand final 19–14 with Manly winning their first ever premiership.

In 1974, Moscatt missed the entire season as Eastern Suburbs finished as minor premiers under the arrival of coach Jack Gibson.  Easts went on to reach the 1974 NSWRL grand final against Canterbury-Bankstown.  Eastern Suburbs won their first premiership in 29 years defeating Canterbury 19–4 at the Sydney Cricket Ground.  The 1974 season would also be the year that Moscatt lost his place in the side as Elwyn Walters had joined the club from rivals South Sydney.

In 1975, Eastern Suburbs went on to claim the 1975 minor premiership and reach the 1975 NSWRL grand final against St George.  Easts went on to win their second straight premiership defeating St George 38–0 at the Sydney Cricket Ground but Moscatt unfortunately missed out on selection to play in the game with coach Jack Gibson preferring to go with Walters at hooker.  The match is mainly remembered for the white boots worn by St George player Graeme Langlands.  The 38–0 scoreline remained as the heaviest defeat in a grand final until Manly defeated Melbourne 40–0 in the 2008 decider.

At the end of 1975, Moscatt departed Eastern Suburbs and returned to Queanbeyan for a final season in the country rugby league competition under his old coach Don Furner.

Outside of football
During his playing career Moscatt had been a beach inspector and then worked in Sydney's rag-trade as a men's fashion sales representative. Post-playing he worked as a butcher and a meat wholesaler.

Moscatt was politically active. He served as President of the Rugby League Players Association in the early 1990s, had a long association with that organisation and was awarded a Life Membership of the RLPA in 2005. In the 1990s he was a Councillor in the Waverley municipality in Sydney and he was the Waverley Mayor in 2004 when that council became one of the first in Australia to introduce a smoking ban on its beaches.

Moscatt married Margaret Peard, a school teacher and the sister of his Rooster's team-mate John Peard.

Death
Moscatt died on 23 August 2019 in Sydney.

References

Sydney Roosters players
Australian rugby league players
Rugby league hookers
Year of birth missing
2019 deaths
Rugby league players from Sydney
Place of death missing